Inline speed skating (Spanish: Patinaje), for the 2013 Bolivarian Games, took place from 24 November to 26 November 2013. The events, for this sport, were held in an indoor track venue.

Medal table
 International Roller Sports Federation News About the 2013 Bolivarian Games

Medalists

References

Events at the 2013 Bolivarian Games
2013 Bolivarian Games
2013 Bolivarian Games
2013 in roller sports